Valona may refer to:

 Vlorë, Albania
 Principality of Valona (1346–1417), a medieval state centered around Vlorë
 Valona, California, United States
 Valona, Georgia, United States
 Valona (song), Mexican poetry and song style